Route 67 is a secondary state highway in the U.S. state of Connecticut, from the town of New Milford in the Greater Danbury area to the town of Woodbridge in the outskirts of New Haven. It generally follows a northwest-southeast path, and is signed north-south.

Route description
Route 67 is mostly a two-lane surface road, with a divided four-lane section in Southbury.  It begins in New Milford as a 0.5 mile concurrency with US 202 as the latter leaves a concurrency with US 7. After crossing the Housatonic River into the center of town, Route 67 breaks away to the southeast.  In Bridgewater, it meets the northern end of Route 133. In Roxbury, it meets the southern end of Route 199 and the western end of Route 317.  It then clips a corner of Woodbury before passing into New Haven County and the town of Southbury, where it passes the northern end of Route 172 before joining US 6 for a 4 lane divided 1.6 mile concurrency leading to a junction with I-84 at Exit 15.  Here, US 6 joins I-84 West and Route 67 continues to the southeast becoming a 2-lane road once again.  After intersecting Route 188, it enters Oxford, where it has a junction with the west end of Route 42.  In Seymour, it passes the western end of Route 313 before crossing the Naugatuck River.  On the east shore of the river, it meets the Route 8 expressway at Exits 21 & 22.  It then passes the northern end of Route 115 before heading into Woodbridge, where Route 67 ends at Route 63.  

Rapid development on Route 67 between Route 8 and I-84 may require the eventual upgrading of this section to a four-lane arterial highway.

History
In the 19th century, part of Route 67 was a toll road known as the Oxford Turnpike that connected the towns of Seymour and Southbury via Oxford. The Oxford Turnpike was chartered in May 1795 and was one of the two earliest private toll roads in Connecticut. In 1922, the road from Woodbridge to Southbury (the old Oxford Turnpike) was designated as State Highway 147 and the road from Southbury to New Milford (via Roxbury and Bridgewater) was designated as State Highway 125. Route 67 was established in the 1932 state highway renumbering from Bridgewater (beginning at modern Route 133, which was then part of an old alignment of Route 25) to New Haven (continuing past Woodbridge along current Route 63). When Route 25 was realigned in April 1943, Route 67 took over the old Route 25 alignment to New Milford. In 1959, Route 67 was relocated to a new road (New Milford Road East) bypassing Bridgewater center, with the former alignment (Clapboard Road) becoming Route 67A. Route 67A was decommissioned, becoming unsigned SR 867, in 1964. Route 67 was truncated to its current eastern/southern end at Route 63 in Woodbridge by 1964.

Junction list

References

External links

067
Transportation in New Haven County, Connecticut
Transportation in Litchfield County, Connecticut